Deulgaon, commonly known as Deulgaon Gada is a village located in Daund taluka of Pune district, in state of Maharashtra, India.

Demographics
As per 2011 census:
Deulgaon Gada has 583 families residing. The village has population of 3051.
Out of the population of 3051, 1581 are males while 1470 are females. 
Literacy rate of the village is 78.42%.
Average sex ratio of the village is 930 females to 1000 males. Average sex ratio of Maharashtra state is 929.

Geography, and transport

References

Villages in Pune district